Leah DeVun is an American contemporary artist and historian who lives in Brooklyn, NY. She received her BA and PhD from Columbia University and is an associate professor at Rutgers University, where she teaches women's and gender history.

Work
DeVun's photography work explores queer and feminist histories. Her artwork has been featured in Artforum, Huffington Post, Art Papers, Hyperallergic, Modern Painters, and New York magazine.

"Our Hands on Each Other"

Her exhibition entitled "Our Hands on Each Other" present photographs documenting the landscapes of rural lesbian communes. She also explores feminist legacies in her work with a special interest in queer and gendered communities, fashion and fandom, memory, politics, and identity. The exhibition opens questions about womanhood, feminism and queerness as explored in rural Mississippi.

Exhibiting Archives / Archiving Exhibits

In the publication "Radical History Review," the work of Leah DeVun is discussed in detail in an article entitled "Archives Behaving Badly." The text discusses the ONE National Gay and Lesbian Archives and includes images of DeVun's work from the 2012 exhibition titled Latent Images.

Prophecy, Alchemy, and the End of Time

She is the author of the book Prophecy, Alchemy, and the End of Time published by Columbia University Press in 2014.

Articles

"Photography, Motherhood, Brooklyn"
An article about DeVun's photograph series on breastfeeding about how motherhood shifts identity entitled "Artist Leah DeVun: On Photography, Motherhood, Brooklyn, And More."

"Feminist Punk Panel Talks Zines, Radical Politics, and Race" about a panel at the Brooklyn Museum that was moderated by DeVun.

"The Academic Feminist: Leah DeVun on Feminist Art and Womyns Lands" an interview in on the artwork and scholarship of Leah DeVun in the publication Feministing. DeVun discusses the legacy of feminist art.

References

External links 
 Leah DeVun's artist website
 Article on 'Our Hands on Each Other' exhibition in the Austin Chronicle

American women historians
American women photographers
Living people
Year of birth missing (living people)
Place of birth missing (living people)
American contemporary artists
Rutgers University faculty
21st-century American women
Columbia College (New York) alumni
Columbia Graduate School of Arts and Sciences alumni